Monoxenus lujae is a species of beetle in the family Cerambycidae. It was described by Hintz in 1911, originally under the genus Dityloderus.

References

lujae
Beetles described in 1911